This is a list of Jamaican record producers.

Anthony Haynes /Haynes Records

B
B.B. Seaton
Bob Andy
Bena Di Senior
Bobby Digital
Boris Gardiner
Bunny Lee
Byron Lee

C
Captain Sinbad
Carl Harvey
Chris Blackwell
Clancy Eccles
Clement S. 'Coxsone' Dodd
Clive Chin
Clive Hunt

D
Danny Ray
Dave Kelly
David Madden
Dean Fraser
Derrick Harriott
Demarco
Dennis Alcapone
Derrick Morgan
Devon Russell
Dobby Dobson
Donovan Germain
Dr Alimantado
Duke Reid

E
Edward Seaga
Enos McLeod
Errol Brown
Errol Holt
Errol Thompson
Etana
Everton Blender

F
Freddie McGregor

G
General Degree
Geoffrey Chung
George Phang
Glen Adams
Glen Brown
Gussie Clarke

H
Harry Johnson (Harry J)
Harry Mudie
Henry "Junjo" Lawes
Herman Chin Loy
Hyman Wright

J 
Jack Ruby
Jack Scorpio
Jah Lloyd
Jah Screw
Jah Thomas
Jah Woosh
Joe Gibbs
Jon Baker
Joseph Hoo Kim
Junior Reid
Kerry Grant
Kamau Preston
Karl Pitterson
Keith Hudson
Ken Lack
King Jammy
King Sporty
King Tubby
Kurtis Mantronik

L
Lee "Scratch" Perry
Leonard Chin
Leroy Sibbles
Leroy Smart
Leslie Kong
Linval Thompson
Lloyd Barnes
Lloyd Charmers
Lloyd Daley
Lynford Anderson

M
Mavado
Max Romeo
Mike Brooks
Mike Beatz
Mikey Chung

N
Niney the Observer

O
Ossie Hibbert

P
Papa San
Phil Pratt
Philip "Fatis" Burrell
Pluto Shervington
Prince Buster
Prince Far I
Prince Jammy
Prince Jazzbo 
Prince Philip

R
Richard Bell
Richie Stephens
Robert Ffrench
Ronnie Nasralla
Roy Cousins
Roy Francis
Rupie Edwards

S
Scientist
Serani
Sonny Roberts
Steely & Clevie
Sanchez
Sean Paul
Sly & Robbie
Sonia Pottinger
Stephen "Di Genius" McGregor
Steven "Lenky" Marsden
Sugar Minott
Supa Dups
Super Cat
Sydney Crooks

T
Tapper Zukie
Tommy Cowan
Trinity

U
Uziah Thompson

V
Vincent "Randy" Chin
Vybz Kartel

W
Wayne Jobson
Willi Williams
Winston Riley

Y
Yabby You

See also
:Category:Jamaican record producers
Music of Jamaica
List of Jamaican backing bands

Jamaican record producers